Vamos is a small town and municipality on the island of Crete, Greece.

Vamos or Vámos may also refer to:

People
Grace Vamos (1898-1992), American cellist, composer and educator
Igor Vamos (born 1968), an American multimedia artist and academic
István Vámos (born 1958), a Hungarian gymnast
Márton Vámos (born 1992), a Hungarian water polo player 
Miklós Vámos (born 1950), a Hungarian writer and talkshow host
Petra Vámos (born 2000), a Hungarian handballer
Roland and Almita Vamos, violin and viola instructors 
Thomas Vámos (born 1938), a Hungarian-Canadian cinematographer
Youri Vámos, Hungarian ballet dancer
Zoltan Vamoș (1936–2001), a Romanian middle-distance runner

Political organisations
Chile Vamos
Vamos Uruguay
Vamos (Guatemala)

Other uses
Vamos (football chant), from Peru
Honda Vamos, the name of two different vehicles
"Vamos", a song by the Pixies from the 1987 EP Come On Pilgrim
"Vamos", an episode of The Good Doctor

See also